Saleh al-Ogaili (died October 9, 2008) was an Iraqi Member of Parliament who was killed (along with two other people) when a bomb, placed on a motorcycle, exploded next to his convoy in 2008 in Habibiyah district, Sadr City, Baghdad.

Political position
Ogaili was considered to belong to the Sadr block in Iraq's Parliament.

Speaking a year before his assassination, Ogaili expressed qualified support for the government of Prime Minister Nouri al-Maliki:

"The Sadr bloc does not seek to change the prime minister....We don't believe in pulling out from the united Shiite alliance. We do not claim that this alliance is the best, but it is the best among what is available now."

References

Iraqi politicians
Assassinated Iraqi politicians
Terrorism deaths in Iraq
2008 deaths